The Skjomen Bridge is a suspension bridge in Narvik Municipality in Nordland county, Norway. The bridge is part of the European route E6 highway. The bridge has nine spans. The Skjomen Bridge was opened in 1972. Between 1938 and 1972 there was a car ferry here, going on a route about 400 meters north of the present bridge.

In popular culture
The "Roadblock" task for the fifth episode of The Amazing Race 17 was filmed at this bridge. The contestant had to rappel down a rope hanging from the bridge and then climb back up the rope.

References

External links

 

Narvik
Road bridges in Nordland
Bridges completed in 1972
Suspension bridges in Norway
1972 establishments in Norway